Valdemar "Valde" Garcia (born 1958) is an American politician who served as a member of the Michigan Senate from 2003 to 2010 and Michigan House of Representatives from 1999 to 2001.

Early life and education 
Garcia was born in St. Johns, Michigan. In 1981, he earned a Bachelor of Arts degree in political science and history from Cedarville University.

Career 
Garcia then served for the next ten years in the United States Army, reaching the rank of captain. He served in the Michigan Army National Guard. From 1991 until 1995 Garcia served on the staff of various Michigan state senators, including Doug Carl and Harmon G. Cropsey.

From 1995 to 1997 Garcia was a teacher at Laingsburg Christian School in Laingsburg, Michigan.

On November 3, 1998, Garcia won the election and became a Republican member of the Michigan House of Representatives for District 86. Garcia defeated Jack M. Brown and Will White. Garcia served until 2001.

Personal life 
Garcia is a Baptist. He and his wife have two children. Garcia and his family live in Howell, Michigan.

References

External links 
 Valde Garcia at ballotpedia.org

|-

|-

1958 births
People from St. Johns, Michigan
People from Howell, Michigan
Cedarville University alumni
Republican Party members of the Michigan House of Representatives
Republican Party Michigan state senators
Living people
United States Army personnel of the Gulf War
National Guard (United States) officers
Michigan National Guard personnel
United States Army War College alumni
United States Army reservists
20th-century American politicians
21st-century American politicians